Otoniel Gonzaga (31 July 1942 – 13 January 2018) was an internationally renowned Filipino tenor singer. He was involved in concerts in collaboration with Filipino singers and musical artists. He also worked with prominent conductors such as Pablo Casals, Herbert von Karajan, Giuseppe Patane, Eugene Ormandy, Max Rudolf, Alberto Erede, Sir John Pritchard and Michael Gielen.

Death
Gonzaga died on 13 January 2018, aged 75, in Vienna.

References

1942 births
2018 deaths
20th-century Filipino male singers
Central Philippine University alumni
Central Philippine University people
Singers from Iloilo